Mary Catherine Gnaedinger (September 28, 1897 – July 31, 1976) was an American editor of science fiction and fantasy pulp magazines.

Education and Career 
Born in Brooklyn, New York as Mary Catherine Jacobson, she attended the Columbia University School of Journalism.  After stints as a society reporter for the Brooklyn Eagle newspaper and work for publishing company E. P. Dutton, she spent several decades of her career working in science fiction.

Personal life 
Mary Jacobson married Louis Beverley Nichol Gnaedinger (1898-1977), a Canadian from Montreal, on September 22, 1919. They probably met at the Columbia University School of Journalism, since both attended at the same time. They had one child, Arthur Beverly Gnaedinger (b. April 13, 1920). Louis B. Gnaedinger was a business reporter for the New York Times and other papers. The couple divorced, date unknown.

Editorial Work in Science Fiction 
In her career as an editor, Mary Gnaedinger became the editor of the science fiction and fantasy magazines Famous Fantastic Mysteries in 1939 and Fantastic Novels in 1940, as well as A. Merritt's Fantasy Magazine.<ref name="Carter">{{cite book|last=Carter|first=Lin|title=Lin Carter Presents The Year's Best Fantasy Stories: 3|publisher=DAW Books|year=1977|isbn=0-87997-338-2|page=10|quote=I ... am going to miss Mary Gnaedinger, who died at her home in the Bronx at the age of 78 ... For nearly thirty years she edited Famous Fantastic Mysteries and ... Fantastic Novels and A. Merritt's Fantasy Magazine, and did yeoman service by tirelessly getting back into print many of the best of fantastic fiction. I owe her a personal debt, for it was in the pages of her magazines that I first read the great romances of H. Rider Haggard and A. Merritt, and such unusual works as Chesterton's The Man Who Was Thursday, Hodgson's The Boats of the 'Glen Carrig''', Cutcliffe Hyne's The Lost Continent... She did good work for the cause of fantasy, and many readers beside myself are indebted to her.}}</ref> She is known as the first female lead editor of a science fiction publication. 

Gnaedinger was known for ardently interacting with her readers, basing the stories she printed in the magazines she edited on their requests, and commonly praising their knowledge of science fiction. In his obituary of Gnaedinger published in 1977, fantasy and science fiction author Lin Carter wrote: 

Copies of Famous Fantastic Mysteries and Fantastic Novels, including issues edited by Mary Gnaedinger, can be found in the City Tech Science Fiction Collection.

 Career Timeline 
 1933, June: joined Newsstand Publications (aka Graham Publications) to edit Romantic Love Secrets 1934, July: after Romantic Love Secrets folds, joins Munsey as Amita Fairgrieve's asst. ed. on All-Story Magazine, a love pulp
 1936, March 11: spoke at Brooklyn's First Presbyterian Church on "Religion and Magazine Fiction"
 1939, October: editor of Munsey's new pulp Famous Fantastic Mysteries; it lasts until June 1953 with Gnaedinger editing
 1940, May: adds Fantastic Novels to her responsibilities
 1940, October: adds Sea Novel Magazine to her responsibilities; it folds after two issues
 1941, April: Fantastic Novels combined with Famous Fantastic Mysteries, i.e., cancelled
 1941, May: takes over Crack-Shot Western; it folds after October issue
 1941, October: adds Cowboy Movie Thrillers to her responsibilities; it lasts four issues
 1942, October: Popular Publications purchases Munsey magazines, retaining Gnaedinger
 1942, December: adds Love Novels Magazine to her responsibilities; it lasts until September 1954
 1943, May: takes over air-pulp Battle Birds; it folds after May 1944 issue
 1948, March: Fantastic Novels is revived with Gnaedinger editing
 1948, October: adds Captain Zero to her responsibilities; it last three issues, November 1949 to March 1950
 1951, July: adds .44 Western to her responsibilities
 1953, May: edits four titles, Love Novels, Detective Story, Rangeland Romance, 15 Range Romances''

External links

References

1897 births
1976 deaths
American magazine editors
Pulp magazines
Women magazine editors